Elias David Joseph Ezra (20 February 1830 - 3 February 1886) was a property owner in Calcutta, India. He was a member of the Baghdadi Jewish community of that city.

Elias was the eldest son of merchant David Joseph Ezra who died in 1882. Elias built the Magen David Synagogue in 1884 in honour of his father.

He married Mozelle Sassoon (1853–1922), daughter of Sir David Sassoon of Bombay.

His son were Sir David Ezra and Alfred Ezra.

See also
History of the Jews in Kolkata

References 

Elias
Jewish philanthropists
1830 births
1886 deaths
19th-century Indian philanthropists